Chapeltown is an unincorporated community in Kent County, Delaware, United States. Thomas' Methodist Episcopal Chapel, which is listed on the National Register of Historic Places, is located in Chapeltown.

References

Unincorporated communities in Kent County, Delaware
Unincorporated communities in Delaware